Potassium channel subfamily K member 4 is a protein that in humans is encoded by the KCNK4 gene.  KCNK4 protein channels are also called TRAAK channels.

Function 

KNCK4 is a gene segment that encodes for the TRAAK (TWIK-related Arachidonic Acid-Stimulated K+) subfamily of mechanosensitive potassium channels. Potassium channels play a role in many cellular processes including action potential depolarization, muscle contraction, hormone secretion, osmotic regulation, and ion flow. The K2P4.1 protein is a lipid-gated ion channel that belongs to the superfamily of potassium channel proteins containing two pore-forming P domains (K2P). K2P4.1 homodimerizes and functions as an outwardly rectifying channel. It is expressed primarily in neural tissues and is stimulated by membrane stretch and polyunsaturated fatty acids.

TRAAK channels are found in mammalian neurons and are part of a protein family of weakly inward rectifying potassium channels.  This subfamily of potassium channels is mechanically gated.  The C-terminal of TRAAK has a charged cluster that is important in maintaining the mechanosensitive properties of the channel.

TRAAK is only expressed in neuronal tissue, and can be found in the brain, spinal cord, and retina, which suggests that it has a function beyond mechanotransduction in terms of neuronal excitability.  The highest levels of TRAAK expression are in the olfactory system, cerebral cortex, hippocampal formation, habenula, basal ganglia, and cerebellum.   TRAAK channels are mechanically activated when there is a convex curvature in the membrane that alters the channel’s activity.  TRAAK channels are thought to have a role in axonal pathfinding, growth cone motility, and neurite elongation, as well as possibly having a role in touch or pain detection.

TRAAK channels play a critical role in the maintenance of the resting membrane potential in excitable cell types. More recently, TRAAK channels have been identified as an integral component of the nervous system, contributing to a variety of important biological functions such as: neurite migration, neurotransmission, and signal transduction across several sensory modalities. TRAAK and related mechanosensitive ion channels initiate these and other complex physiological processes by detecting asymmetrical pressure gradients generated across the inner and outer leaflets of the cell membrane, characterizing a rich profile of mechanical bilayer interactions. Furthermore, KCNK4 expression patterns the axonal segments of neurons in both central and peripheral nervous systems by inserting TRAAK membrane protein channels at the Nodes of Ranvier and allowing for saltatory conduction. The pathologies that are associated with improper KCNK4 expression such as Hirchsprung's Disease and FHEIG (facial dysmorphism, hypertrichosis, epilepsy, developmental/ID delay, and gingival overgrowth) syndrome, manifest accordingly as a constellation of neurological symptoms resulting from neuronal dysplasia. Animal models containing known syndromic KCNK4 mutations have recapitulated these phenotypic abnormalities. High TRAAK channel density has also been implicated in the resulting cerebral ischemia following the event of a stroke.

See also 
 Tandem pore domain potassium channel

References

Further reading

External links 
 

Ion channels